Mian Ghulam Nabi Shori popularly known as Shori Mian  (1742–92) was an Indian composer of Hindustani classical music. He was a court singer of Asaf-Ud-Dowlah, Nawab of Awadh. He composed tappa, one of the most difficult classical forms, in Punjab. The brisk and ornate tappa form, romantic in nature, tappa's text is always in Punjabi.

It was supposed to be a song of the cameleers of Punjab and Rajasthan.

Early life
He was born in Multan, Punjab, to Ghulam Rasool Khan. The common myth tells that he was initially trained in Khayal singing and had a great command on Taan.

Tappa
He was not satisfied with Khayal for expressing his skill in singing Taan; he restlessly traveled in Punjab, where he listened to the folk songs of camel-riders, which he thought to be suitable for his own style of singing. He composed Tappa using various ornamentations with Taan, Jamjama, Khatka, etc. In the Tappas of Shori Miyan, in Antara we find his name as 'Shori'.

References

1742 births
1792 deaths
Hindustani singers
Hindustani composers
Punjabi-language singers
18th-century Indian male classical singers
Awadh
18th-century Indian composers
Indian male composers